The 2010 Jarama Superleague Formula round was a Superleague Formula round  held on June 20, 2010, at the Circuito del Jarama circuit, Madrid, Spain. It was the second year in a row that Superleague Formula visited the Jarama circuit, and was the first of two races in Spain for 2010. It was the fourth round of the 2010 Superleague Formula season.

Eighteen clubs took part including two Spanish clubs: Atlético Madrid and Sevilla FC.

Support races included the FIA GT3 European Championship.

Report

Qualifying

Race 1

Race 2

Super Final

Results

Qualifying
 In each group, the top four qualify for the quarter-finals.

Group A

Group B

Knockout stages

Grid

Race 1

Race 2

Super Final

Standings after the round

References

External links
 Official results from the Superleague Formula website

Jarama
Superleague Formula Jarama